The Tumanishvili or Tumanyan, later Russianized as Toumanov or Toumanoff is an Armeno-Georgian noble (tavadi) family.

History 
The family claimed roots in the ancient Armenian noble dynasty of the Mamikonians (Mamikonids), One branch of the family, the Toumaniani, belonged to the Armenian Church; the other branch, the Toumanishvili, was Greek Orthodox.

The house of T’umanids, moved to Georgia from Armenia Maritima (Cilicia) after the twelfth century and adopted the last name Toumanishvili. They were acknowledged by the Kings of Georgia as tavadi (princes), and received hereditary rank as the King's "mdivanbeg" (counselor or vizier).

The Tumanishvili family was on the list of Georgian high nobility that was attached to the Treaty of Georgievsk concluded with the Georgian King Erekle II on July 24, 1783 and was recognized on the Russian Empire's list of princely families in December 1850.

The Prince Mikhail Tumanov was the Ambassador (Minister plenipotentiary) of Armenia to Georgia during the first republic of Armenia.

People with these names 
 Cyril Toumanoff, Russian-born Georgian historian
 Tamara Toumanova, Georgian-American ballerina
 Joseph Tumanishvili, stage director of the Stanislavski and Nemirovich-Danchenko Theatre in Moscow after 1943
 Mikheil Tumanishvili (1921–1996), Georgian theatre director
 Hovhannes Tumanyan, Armenian poet

References 

Noble families of Georgia (country)
Russian noble families
Georgian-language surnames
Armenian nobility